The 1903 Marshall Thundering Herd football team represented Marshall College (now Marshall University) in the 1903 college football season. Marshall posted a 3–1–1 record, outscoring its opposition 37–25. Home games were played on a campus field called "Central Field" which is presently Campus Commons.

Schedule

References

Marshall
Marshall Thundering Herd football seasons
Marshall Thundering Herd football